Endrass was a "wolfpack" of German U-boats that operated from 12 to 17 June 1942 in attacking Convoy HG 84 that comprised 23 Allied ships. The group's name commemorated the U-boat commander Engelbert Endrass, who was killed in action in December 1941.

U-boats, commanders and dates
 , Walter Flachsenberg, 12–16 June
 , Horst Uphoff, 12–17 June
 , Dietrich Lohmann, 12–17 June	 
 , Ernst Vogelsang, 12–17 June 
 , Rudolf Schendel, 12–17 June
 , Werner-Karl Schulz, 12–17 June
 , Erich Topp, 12–17 June
 , Helmut Möhlmann, 12–17 June
 , Günther Heydemann, 12–17 June

Ships hit by this Wolfpack
Five ships of Convoy HG 84, assembled at Gibraltar for passage to Liverpool, were sunk, all by the U-boat U-552 in the early hours of 15 June.

Etrib, Pelayo & Slemdal

City of Oxford and Thurso
U-552 struck again at 04:34, firing three torpedoes at the convoy. Two British merchant ships, the 2,759-ton  and the 2,436-ton  were hit and sunk.

References
Notes

 

Wolfpacks of 1942